Siskiyou County is a county located in the northernmost part of the U.S. state of California. As of the 2020 census, the population was 44,076. Its county seat is Yreka and its highest point is Mount Shasta. It falls within the Cascadia bioregion.

Siskiyou County is in the Shasta Cascade region along with the Oregon border. Because of its outdoor recreation, Mt. Shasta, McCloud River, and Gold Rush era history, it is an important tourist destination within the state.

History

Siskiyou County was created on March 22, 1852, from parts of Shasta and Klamath Counties, and named after the Siskiyou mountain range. Parts of the county's territory were given to Modoc County in 1855.

The county is the site of the central section of the Siskiyou Trail, which ran between California's Central Valley and the Pacific Northwest. The Siskiyou Trail followed indigenous footpaths, and was extended by Hudson's Bay Company trappers in the 1830s. Its length was increased by "Forty-Niners" during the California Gold Rush.

After the discovery of an important gold strike near today's Yreka, California, in 1851, prospectors flooded the area. This was described in detail by Joaquin Miller in his semi-autobiographical novel Life Amongst the Modocs.

In the mid-1880s, the construction of the Central Pacific Railroad along the Siskiyou Trail brought the first wave of tourism. Visitors were drawn by the county's many summer resorts, and to hunt or fish in the largely untouched region. The Southern Pacific railroad, the successor to the Central Pacific, called its rail line “The Road of A Thousand Wonders.”

In the early 1940s, Siskiyou County was home to the semi-serious State of Jefferson movement, which sought to create a new state from several counties of northern California and the adjoining counties of southern Oregon. The movement has seen a revival in recent years.

The origin of the word Siskiyou is not known. It may be a Chinook Jargon word for a "bob-tailed horse" (ultimately originating in Cree), or as was argued before the State Senate in 1852, from the French Six Cailloux (six stones), a name given to a ford on the Umpqua River by Michel Laframboise and his Hudson's Bay Company trappers in 1832. Others claim the Six Cailloux name was appropriated by Stephen Meek, another Hudson's Bay Company trapper who discovered Scott Valley, for a crossing on the Klamath River near Hornbrook.

The county is home to the Black Bear Ranch, a commune started in 1968 with the slogan "Free Land for free people."

On September 4, 2013, the Siskiyou County Board of Supervisors voted 4 to 1 to secede from the State of California.

Geography

It is the fifth-largest county by area in California.

Siskiyou County is geographically diverse. From towering Mount Shasta (elev. 14,179 ft/(4,322 m)) near the center of the county, to lakes and dense forests, as well as desert, chaparral, and memorable waterfalls, the county is home to world-famous trout-fishing rivers and streams, such as the Sacramento and McCloud rivers. The county is dotted as well with lakes and reservoirs, such as Castle Lake and Lake Siskiyou. Mount Shasta itself has a winter sports center. Pastoral Scott Valley in the western part of the county has many wide, tree-lined meadows, supporting large cattle ranches. The basins of northeastern Siskiyou County, including Butte Valley, Lower Klamath and Tule Lake basins, have some of the deepest and richest soils in the state, producing alfalfa, potatoes, horseradish, and brewing barley. Butte Valley nurseries are the leading source of premium strawberry plants in North America. Much of the county is densely forested with pine, fir, incense-cedar, oak, and madrone; Siskiyou County is also home to the rare Baker's Cypress Tree, Cupressus bakeri, which grows in only eleven scattered locations in the world, five of which are in Siskiyou County. 
The county's natural resources are most often used these days for skiing, snowboarding, hiking, mountain biking, camping, and wilderness recreation, as historic logging practices have been largely discontinued due to Federal and State environmental regulations. The county's water is viewed as sufficiently pure and abundant that the county is a source of significant amounts of bottled water, distributed throughout the country. A large Crystal Geyser plant is at the base of Mt. Shasta, near Weed.

Flora and fauna
Substantial amounts of the county are forested within the Siskiyou and Cascade Ranges, including significant oak woodland and mixed conifer forests. Siskiyou County is the northern extent of the range for California Buckeye, a widespread California endemic. The Klamath National Forest occupies  of land which includes elements in Siskiyou County as well as Jackson County, Oregon.

Adjacent counties
 Josephine County, Oregon - northwest
 Jackson County, Oregon - north
 Klamath County, Oregon - northeast
 Modoc County - east
 Shasta County - southeast
 Trinity County - south
 Humboldt County - southwest
 Del Norte County - west

National protected areas

 Butte Valley National Grassland
 Klamath National Forest (part)
 Lava Beds National Monument (part)
 Lower Klamath National Wildlife Refuge (part)
 Modoc National Forest (part)
 Rogue River National Forest (part)
 Shasta National Forest (part)
 Six Rivers National Forest (part)
 Tule Lake National Wildlife Refuge (part)
 Tule Lake Unit, World War II Valor in the Pacific National Monument (part)

Transportation

Major highways

 Interstate 5
 U.S. Route 97
 State Route 3
 State Route 89
 State Route 96
 State Route 139
 State Route 161
 State Route 263
 State Route 265

Public transportation
Siskiyou Transit And General Express (STAGE) operates buses connecting the more populated areas of the county. Amtrak trains stop in Dunsmuir. Amtrak California motorcoaches operate from Sacramento and Medford, OR, with stops in Yreka, Weed, Mount Shasta, and Dunsmuir, for passengers connecting to and from Amtrak trains in Sacramento or Stockton.

Airports
Siskiyou County owns and operates Butte Valley Airport, Happy Camp Airport, Scott Valley Airport, Siskiyou County Airport and Weed Airport (all general aviation). Dunsmuir Municipal-Mott Airport and Montague-Yreka Rohrer Field are also within the county.

The closest airports for commercial domestic plane departures are Rogue Valley International-Medford Airport north of the county in Medford, Oregon, Crater Lake–Klamath Regional Airport, northeast of the county in Klamath Falls, Oregon, and Redding Municipal Airport south of the county in Redding, California.

Politics

Voter registration statistics

Cities by population and voter registration

Overview 
Siskiyou is a strongly Republican county in Presidential and congressional elections. The last Democrat to win a majority in the county was Lyndon Johnson in 1964; however, Bill Clinton won a plurality of votes in 1992.

On November 4, 2008, Siskiyou County voted 60.1% for Proposition 8 which amended the California Constitution to ban same-sex marriages. Dunsmuir and Mount Shasta voted against Prop 8. 

On September 3, 2013, the Siskiyou County Board of Supervisors voted 4–1 in favor of secession from California to form a proposed state named Jefferson. A similar move was made in 1941, but was shelved due to the attack on Pearl Harbor.

Crime 

The following table includes the number of incidents reported and the rate per 1,000 persons for each type of offense.

Cities by population and crime rates

Demographics

2011

Places by population, race, and income

2010

The 2010 United States Census reported Siskiyou County had a population of 44,900. The racial makeup of Siskiyou County was 38,030 (84.7%) White, 571 (1.3%) African American, 1,814 (4.0%) Native American, 540 (1.2%) Asian, 80 (0.2%) Pacific Islander, 1,491 (3.3%) from other races, and 2,374 (5.3%) from two or more races. Hispanic or Latino of any race were 4,615 persons (10.3%).

2000

As of the census of 2000, there were 44,301 people, 18,556 households, and 12,228 families residing in the county. The population density was 7/sq mi (3/km2). There were 21,947 housing units at an average density of 4/sq mi (1/km2). The racial makeup of the county was 87.1% White, 1.3% Black or African American, 3.9% Native American, 1.2% Asian, 0.1% Pacific Islander, 2.8% from other races, and 3.7% from two or more races. 7.6% of the population were Hispanic or Latino of any race. 13.5% were of German, 12.0% English, 9.8% Irish, 9.5% American and 7.1% Italian ancestry according to Census 2000. 91.7% spoke English and 5.7% Spanish as their first language. As of March 2012, the largest self-reported ancestry groups in Siskiyou County are 15% German, 13% English, 12% Irish and 6% Italian.

There were 18,556 households, out of which 27.6% had children under the age of 18 living with them, 51.7% were married couples living together, 10.1% had a female householder with no husband present, and 34.1% were non-families. 28.6% of all households were made up of individuals, and 12.8% had someone living alone who was 65 years of age or older. The average household size was 2.35 and the average family size was 2.87.

In the county, the population was spread out, with 24.0% under the age of 18, 6.7% from 18 to 24, 22.7% from 25 to 44, 28.4% from 45 to 64, and 18.1% who were 65 years of age or older. The median age was 43 years. For every 100 females there were 96.5 males. For every 100 females age 18 and over, there were 94.1 males.

The median income for a household in the county was $29,530, and the median income for a family was $36,890. Males had a median income of $31,936 versus $22,650 for females. The per capita income for the county was $17,570. About 14.0% of families and 18.6% of the population were below the poverty line, including 26.6% of those under age 18 and 7.3% of those age 65 or over.

Communities

Cities

Dorris
Dunsmuir
Etna
Fort Jones
Montague
Mount Shasta
Tulelake
Weed
Yreka (county seat)

Census-designated places

 Carrick
 Edgewood
 Gazelle
 Greenview
 Grenada
 Happy Camp
 Hornbrook
 Lake Shastina
 Macdoel
 McCloud
 Mount Hebron
 Tennant

Other unincorporated communities

 Ager
 Bestville
 Big Springs
 Black Bear
 Black Butte
 Bray
 Callahan
 Cecilville
 Clear Creek
 Forks of Salmon
 Fort Goff
 Grass Lake
 Hamburg
 Hatfield (partial)
 Hilt
 Horse Creek
 Klamath River
 Klamathon
 Lake Siskiyou
 Little Shasta
 Mott, a hamlet between Shasta Springs and Azalea
 Mugginsville
 Oro Fino
 Pondosa
 Sawyers Bar
 Scott Bar
 Seiad Valley
 Somes Bar
 Thompson Creek

Ghost towns 
 Gullion's Bar
 Negro Flat

Population ranking

The population ranking of the following table is based on the 2020 census of Siskiyou County.

† county seat

See also 
List of school districts in Siskiyou County, California
 List of museums in the Shasta Cascade (California)
National Register of Historic Places listings in Siskiyou County, California
Upper Soda Springs
Shasta Springs
Yreka Western Railroad

Notes

References

Further reading
 Harry L. Wells, History of Siskiyou County, California: Illustrated with Views of Residences, Business Buildings and Natural Scenery and Containing Portraits and Biographies of Its Leading Citizens and Pioneers. Oakland, CA: D.J. Stewart and Co., 1881.

External links

Museum of the Siskiyou Trail
Siskiyou County Visitors Bureau

 

 
1852 establishments in California
California counties
Shasta Cascade
California Gold Rush
Chinook Jargon place names
Populated places established in 1852